The Bourne Identity may refer to:

The Bourne Identity (novel), a 1980 novel by Robert Ludlum
The Bourne Identity (1988 film), a made-for-television film adaptation of the novel, starring Richard Chamberlain and Jaclyn Smith
The Bourne Identity (2002 film), a film adaptation of the novel, starring Matt Damon

See also
Bourne (franchise)